Peaksville is an unincorporated community in Clark County, in the U.S. state of Missouri.

History
Peaksville was platted in 1852, and named after Dr. Peake, a pioneer citizen. A post office called Peakesville was established in 1858, and remained in operation until 1905.

References

Unincorporated communities in Clark County, Missouri
Unincorporated communities in Missouri